Studebaker Building may refer to:
 Studebaker Building (St. Petersburg, Florida)
 Studebaker Building (Chicago)
 Studebaker Building (Manhattan), in midtown Manhattan
 Studebaker Building (Columbia University), in the Manhattanville section of Manhattan
 Studebaker Building (Brooklyn) a designated New York City landmark in Crown Heights, Brooklyn